The Journal of Guidance, Control, and Dynamics is a monthly peer-reviewed scientific journal published by the American Institute of Aeronautics and Astronautics. It covers the science and technology of guidance, control, and dynamics of flight. The editor-in-chief is Ping Lu (San Diego State University). It was established in 1978 as Journal of Guidance and Control, obtaining its current title in 1982.

Abstracting and indexing
The journal is abstracted and indexed in:

According to the Journal Citation Reports, the journal has a 2017 impact factor of 2.024.

History
The journal was published bimonthly until it switched to monthly in 2015. Prior editors have been Donald C. Fraser (1978–1992), Kyle T. Alfriends (1992–1996), and George T. Schmidt (1997–2013).

References

External links

Aerospace engineering journals
English-language journals
Monthly journals
Publications established in 1978